Virga is a genus of skippers in the family Hesperiidae.

Species
Recognised species in the genus Virga include:
 Virga virginius ( Möschler, 1883)

References

Natural History Museum Lepidoptera genus database

Hesperiinae
Hesperiidae genera